Lyn Ashley (born Lynette Ashley Rumble; 18 March 1940) is an Australian actress who worked in the United Kingdom on television during the 1960s.

Early life
Ashley was born Lynette Ashley Rumble in Townsville, Queensland, on 18 March 1940. She is the daughter of actress Madge Ryan.

Career
Her television credits include Maigret, The Saint, Danger Man, Compact, Doctor Who (in the serial Galaxy 4), The Saint and Monty Python's Flying Circus. She screen tested for Emma Peel's replacement on The Avengers.

She also acted in films such as  Mister Ten Per Cent, I'll Never Forget What's'isname (1967) and Quest for Love (1971).

Ashley was married to Monty Python member Eric Idle from 1969 until 1975; they have one son together, Carey, born in 1973. She was frequently credited on Monty Python's Flying Circus as 'Mrs Idle'.

She was later a cast member of the early 1990s soap opera Families.

References

External links
 
 Lyn Ashley at Theatricalia

Australian television actresses
Australian expatriate actresses in the United Kingdom
Living people
1940 births